Komasa (plural: Komasowie, commonly meaning "Komasa family") is a Polish-language surname. The Komasa family is sometimes described as an "artistic clan" of film actors and directors, singers, and musicians. 

Notable people with this surname include:

Jan Komasa (born 1981), Polish film director, screenwriter, and producer 
Szymon Komasa (born 1985), Polish operatic baritone
 (born 1949), Polish stage, film, TV, and dubbing actor and stage director 
 a.k.a. Antoni Komasa-Łazarkiewicz, Polish composer

References

Polish-language surnames